UMSL South is a St. Louis MetroLink station. This station serves the primarily academic South Campus of the University of Missouri-St. Louis. It features 130 park and ride spaces.

In 2014, Metro's Arts in Transit program commissioned the work Changing Identities by Catharine Magel for installation at the station. Changing Identities honors four individuals killed in a bus crash and reflects on the spiritual and eternal aspects of human nature, our connection to the universe, and our solitary journeys through life.

In 2019, a developer pitched a mixed-use development along the east side of the station on land owned by the city of Normandy, Missouri. It would have featured 237 apartments and 41 homes. As of 2022, the project was on hold indefinitely.

Station layout

References

External links
 St. Louis Metro

MetroLink stations in St. Louis County, Missouri
Red Line (St. Louis MetroLink)
Railway stations in Missouri at university and college campuses
Railway stations in the United States opened in 1993